Mike Little (born 12 May 1962) is an English web developer and writer. He is the co-founder of the free and open source web software WordPress along with Matt Mullenweg.

Biography
Mike Little was born in 1962 to a Nigerian father who was a musician and an English mother in England. He was educated at Stockport School.

In 2003, Little and Matt Mullenweg started working on a project in which they built on b2/cafelog and later named it WordPress, releasing the first version on 27 May 2003.

In June 2013, Little was awarded the SAScon's "Outstanding Contribution to Digital" award for his part in co-founding and developing WordPress.

Bibliography
 Douglass, Robert T.; Little, Mike; Smith, Jared W. (2006).Building Online Communities With Drupal, PhpBB, and WordPress

References

External links 
Personal site

Living people
Black British people
English people of Nigerian descent
Social entrepreneurs
Web development
Computer programmers
Web developers
1962 births
WordPress
Free software programmers